Severin Brice Bikoko (born 24 September 1988 in Yaoundé) is a Cameroonian striker.

References

External links

1988 births
Living people
Cameroonian footballers
Çaykur Rizespor footballers
Akhisarspor footballers
Expatriate footballers in Turkey
Cameroonian expatriate footballers
Cameroonian expatriate sportspeople in Turkey
Kayseri Erciyesspor footballers
Süper Lig players
Association football forwards